In the U.S. state of South Carolina, U.S. Route 17 (US 17) is a  north–south U.S. Highway located near the Atlantic Ocean. The highway enters the state from Georgia at the Savannah River and serves Hardeeville, Charleston, Georgetown, and Myrtle Beach, before entering North Carolina near Calabash.

Route description
US 17 enters into South Carolina in Jasper County as a two-lane road and within  enters Hardeeville, where it becomes a major four-lane freeway configuration. US 17 intersects Interstate 95 at exit 5 in Hardeeville and after the intersection with US 321, runs parallel to Interstate 95 until Ridgeland, where it merges with the interstate at exit 22 until Point South. At Point South, US 17 leaves I-95 at exit 33 and heads eastward into northern Beaufort County, sharing a concurrency with US 21 until Gardens Corner. US 21 splits off to Beaufort while US 17 heads northeast into the ACE Basin and Colleton County.

The stretch of US 17 between Gardens Corner and Jacksonboro was a scenic yet rural two-lane road configuration that has proven to be a very dangerous and deadly stretch for motorists. SCDOT is working on improving portions of the roadway, including widening some portions and reducing the speed limits. Since, this road has been upgraded to a four-lane divided highway. Once in Jacksonboro, the road enters into Charleston County crossing over the Edisto River and regaining a four-lane configuration for the remainder of the state. The road passes through several rural communities as it approaches Charleston from the west. Just before the interchange with Interstate 526 (I-526) major commercial development starts and continues into the West Ashley neighborhood of Charleston. The  section running from Sam Rittenberg Boulevard to SC 171 has been named the "Charleston Nine Memorial Highway", in honor of nine Charleston firefighters killed in the line of duty in the Charleston Sofa Super Store fire on June 18, 2007. The route then approaches the Ashley River.

In Charleston, US 17 traverses the Ashley River Drawbridges and comes onto the Charleston Peninsula, being routed north of the historical areas of the city. The first portion is at-grade and has a few traffic-signals for flow purposes. This section of the route is named the "Septima P. Clark Parkway". Upon reaching the eastern terminus of I-26, US 17 becomes controlled-access and above grade as it approaches the Cooper River via the Arthur Ravenel Jr. Bridge and the stretch of US 17 in Charleston is infamous among locals for its traffic congestion, especially on weekday mornings.

Upon crossing the river, the highway enters Mount Pleasant at grade and is signalized for several miles up through the second interchange with I-526 and connecting roads to the Isle of Palms and Sullivan's Island.  The road leaves the Charleston metro area by entering the Francis Marion National Forest and going through the rural communities of Awendaw and McClellanville on its northeastern journey to Georgetown.  US 17 crosses the marsh-lined Santee River as it enters Georgetown County.  After going around the city of Georgetown, US 17 crosses eastward over the Waccamaw / Pee Dee river system before making a northward turn along the Grand Strand.

The last component of US 17 runs close to the Atlantic, beginning at the Hobcaw Barony and DeBordieu, passing by Pawleys Island and going past the Litchfield beaches and Murrells Inlet.  It then enters into Horry County and passing Garden City, Surfside Beach, and arriving in Myrtle Beach.  US 17 splits here between a business route and the standard route, which remains west of the beach and tourist areas served by Business 17.  The roads rejoin north of the city and continue as US 17 through Atlantic Beach, North Myrtle Beach, and Little River where the South Carolina Welcome Center can be found across from the intersection with SC 179 before crossing into North Carolina. The portions from Murrells Inlet to the state line are quite congested at times, though the soon to be constructed Interstate 73 should assist in alleviating many traffic issues.

History
The route was part of the 1926 approved plan for a national system of highways, and appears on the approved map. When first signed, US 17 followed a route that went through Florence and Marion.

At the time, U.S. routes in South Carolina used a dual-numbering system; US 17 was also signed SC 1 from Georgia to Yemassee, SC 30 from Yemassee to Walterboro, SC 6 from Walterboro to Charleston, SC 2 from Charleston to Goose Creek, SC 41 from Goose Creek to Florence, SC 3 from Florence to North Carolina. By 1928, all of the dual numbers had been removed except for SC 2. The entire route from Georgia to North Carolina was paved by 1930.  At one point the route from Green Pond to Jacksonboro was SC 32.

The early routing was already identified to be shifted to the Kings Highway which would pass through Myrtle Beach and Georgetown; re-routing occurred in 1935.

The first tourist welcome center in South Carolina opened in February 1968 on US 17 near Little River.

A segment of US 17 between Ridgeland and Point South once contained two four-lane divided sections The first is in Coosawhatchie between north of the culvert for Little Bees Creek and north of the bridge over the Coosawhatchie River. The second is in the vicinity of some 1941-built bridges over the Tullifinny River and its tributary the Harbor River. From 1971 to 1975, portions of that segment were relocated onto Interstate 95. The divided section in Coosawhatchie remains intact, while the northbound lane near the Tullifinny wetlands was closed, and today is used for a fishing pier, a parking lot of a church, and a private home.

Major intersections

See also

 Special routes of U.S. Route 17

References

External links

 
 US 17 at Virginia Highways' South Carolina Highways Annex
 SouthEast Roads.com: US 17 & Cooper River Bridges
 SouthEast Roads.com: northbound images
 SouthEast Roads.com: southbound images

17
 
Transportation in Jasper County, South Carolina
Transportation in Beaufort County, South Carolina
Transportation in Colleton County, South Carolina
Transportation in Charleston County, South Carolina
Transportation in Georgetown County, South Carolina
Transportation in Horry County, South Carolina
Transportation in Charleston, South Carolina
Mount Pleasant, South Carolina
Georgetown, South Carolina
17